Crikvenica is a city in Croatia, located on the Adriatic in the Primorje-Gorski Kotar County.

Names

The names of the town in various languages include:

Geography

Crikvenica is located southeast of Rijeka and is the largest settlement on the coast of the Vinodol coastal area.

Towns near Crikvenica include Kraljevica, Selce and Novi Vinodolski.

In the last twenty years, due to urban expansion of Crikvenica itself and expansion of the nearby town of Selce, the two were merged into a mini-conglomerate.

Population

In the 2011 census, Crikvenica had a total municipal population of 11,122, in the following settlements:
 Crikvenica, population 6,860
 Dramalj, population 1,485
 Jadranovo, population 1,224
 Selce, population 1,553

History 
Crikvenica was developed on the site of a Roman era settlement and military base called Ad Turres.

Old Crikvenica was originally an offshoot of the village of Kotor, which is located on a nearby hill and shares its name with that of the village.

The name of the town derives from the word for 'church' (Croatian: crkva, in dialect crikva), referring to the monastery church of the Pauline Fathers, which was built by Nikola IV Frankopan nearby in 1412. Beside the church and the monastery at the mouth of the Dubračina, the nearby port of Grižane grew up. In 1760 the local worthy moved from Bribir to Crikvenica and thus it became the centre of the whole Vinodol coast. A great fire of 1776, in which nearly entire Kotor was burnt down, accelerated the migration from the hills towards the coastal areas.

In the 19th century Crikvenica began to attract many tourists, which brought about a turning point in its history. In 1877 a harbour was built in Crikvenica, in 1888 a bathing beach and as early as 1891 the first hotel had opened. In 1895 the Hotel Therapia was opened with 120 beds and a Hydrotherapy Institute. In 1902 the Hotel Crikvenica was built, in 1903 the Bellevue and in 1905 the Miramare. In 1906 Crikvenica became officially a health resort and due to its favourable climate, in the space of just 16 years Crikvenica became the most important resort on the riviera. Today, together with Selce, it is one of the most attractive parts of the Kvarner coast, as well as of the North Adriatic coast of Croatia in general.

In the late 19th and early 20th century, Crikvenica was a district capital in the Modruš-Rijeka County of the Kingdom of Croatia-Slavonia.

Notable people
Josif Pančić (1814–1888), botanist
Ljerko Spiller (1908–2008), Croatian and Argentine violinist
 The family of Argentine Cardinal Estanislao Esteban Karlic (born 1926) came from Karlići, a small village approximately  outside Crikvenica

Photo gallery

See also
Giulio Clovio

References

Bibliography

External links 

 

Cities and towns in Croatia
Populated coastal places in Croatia
Roman towns and cities in Croatia
Populated places in Primorje-Gorski Kotar County
Modruš-Rijeka County
1412 establishments in Europe
15th-century establishments in Croatia